"The Power of the Dream" is a song by Canadian singer Celine Dion, released as a single in Japan on 20 August 1996. It was written and produced by David Foster, Linda Thompson, and Babyface for the opening ceremony of the 1996 Summer Olympics. Dion performed it in front of more than 100,000 people, in addition to over three and a half billion television viewers. She gave away the money she received for the occasion, to support Canadian athletes. USA Today listed it as the second best Olympics theme song of all time.

Background and release
The music video shows Céline Dion performing the song during the opening ceremony of the 1996 Summer Olympics with David Foster on the piano, accompanied by the Atlanta Symphony Orchestra and the Centennial Choir (Morehouse College Glee Club, Spelman College Glee Club and the Atlanta Symphony Orchestra Chorus).

The single peaked at number 30 on the Oricon Singles Chart in Japan and was certified gold (75,000 copies sold). Although it was not released in other countries, many radio stations all over the world played "The Power of the Dream" and it even charted on some airplay charts.

The song was included on the limited editions of the Falling into You album in Asia and Australia. "The Power of the Dream" was also a B-side of "Because You Loved Me", "It's All Coming Back to Me Now", and "All by Myself" singles. It became available worldwide on Dion's 2000 compilation The Collector's Series, Volume One. In 2008, the song was included on the U.S. version of My Love: Essential Collection.

Dion performed the song during her 1996/1997 Falling Into You: Around the World tour.

Formats and track listings
Japanese CD single
"The Power of the Dream" – 4:30
"It's All Coming Back to Me Now" (Radio Edit) – 5:31

Personnel and credits
Credits adapted from Discogs.

 Celine Dion: main artist, lead vocals
 David Foster: writer, producer, keyboards, bass (synth)
 Babyface: writer, producer, drum programming (kick programming)
 Linda Thompson: writer
 Simon Franglen: drum programming (snare sound) and synclavier
 Dan Shea: programming (synthesizer)
 William Ross: arranger (orchestra) and conductor
 Mervyn Warren: conductor (choir)

 The London Symphony Orchestra: orchestra
 Dean Parks: acoustic guitar
 Michael Thompson: electric guitar
 David Reitzas and Felipe Elgueta: engineers
 Humberto Gatica, Jon Gass and Marnie Riley: recording engineers
 Mick Guzauski: mixing engineer
 Kyle Bess and Paul Boutin: assistant engineers

Charts

Certifications and sales

|}

Release history

References

External links
 

1996 singles
1996 songs
1996 Summer Olympics
Celine Dion songs
Olympic theme songs
Song recordings produced by Babyface (musician)
Song recordings produced by David Foster
Songs written by Babyface (musician)
Songs written by David Foster
Songs written by Linda Thompson (actress)